Autosticha mingchrica is a moth in the family Autostichidae. It was described by Kyu-Tek Park and Chun-Sheng Wu in 2003. It is found in Taiwan.

The wingspan is 16–19 mm. The forewings are densely covered with dark fuscous scales. There is a small brownish-orange spot at the base and the costa is fuscous at the extreme base. The discal stigmata are dark brown, the first at the middle, with the plical below the first, while the second is larger and found at the end of the cell. There is a series of brownish-fuscous marginal dots. The hindwings are grey.

Etymology
The species name is derived from the type location.

References

Moths described in 2003
Autosticha
Moths of Taiwan